The Old Forge Dam is a dam located in Old Forge, New York. It holds water back from the Fulton Chain of Lakes to avoid flooding the Moose River.

References

 

Buildings and structures in Herkimer County, New York
Dams in New York (state)